The Sony Ericsson Java Platform is a set of profiles describing particular Sony Ericsson Java implementation. It was designed to help developers to focus on a platform rather than on a variety of different product names. Two platform branches exist, supporting Symbian (SJP) and non-Symbian (JP) based phones respectively. The platforms are implemented through an evolutionary approach in order to ensure forwards compatibility between platform versions, which means that all JSRs (except the optional) implemented on one platform are also implemented on all higher platforms. Normally each platform version is used in several phone models. Some platform features are optional, that is, configurable. For example, the Java Bluetooth APIs (JSR 82) are only enabled for phones which actually support Bluetooth wireless technology. These interfaces are mostly invisible to the end user, who only has to download a JAR file containing the application to the phone.

Note: JSR 184, Mascot Capsule Ver. 3 and JSR 234 are not enabled in Z310 series.

Sony Mobile
Mobile software
Java device platform